Acalypha swallowensis is a species of flowering plant in the family Euphorbiaceae, native to the Santa Cruz Islands in the Pacific Ocean.

References

swallowensis
Flora of the Santa Cruz Islands
Plants described in 1940